Mohammad Zeeshan Ayyub Khan  is an Indian actor who appears in Hindi films. He is frequently cast in supporting roles, and has appeared in more than 25 films in a career which has spanned eight years. He has also worked in a Hindi serial "Kyunki... Jeena Isi Ka Naam Hai" which was telecasted on Doordarshan in 2008. He has collaborated with director Aanand L. Rai on four films.

Ayyub began his film career with a negative role in Raj Kumar Gupta's financially successful semi-biographical thriller No One Killed Jessica (2011), which earned him a nomination for the Filmfare Award for Best Male Debut. Subsequently, he featured briefly in the box-office hits Mere Brother Ki Dulhan (2011), Jannat 2 (2012), Raanjhanaa (2013), Shahid (2013), Raja Natwarlal (2014), Tubelight (2017), Manikarnika: The Queen of Jhansi (2019), and Article 15 (2019). Ayyub had his biggest commercial successes with brief roles in the romantic comedy Tanu Weds Manu: Returns (2015), the crime thriller Raees (2017), and the science drama film Mission Mangal (2019), all of which rank among the highest-grossing Indian films of all time. His only leading role in his career was in Sameer (2017), which proved to be one of the year's biggest disasters.

Early and personal life
Ayyub was born in 1984 and brought up in Delhi. He graduated from Kirori Mal College and completed his theatre training from National School of Drama (NSD), Delhi in 2006. He married Rasika Agashe in 2007. They have a daughter.

Acting career

Early work (2011–13)

Ayyub made his acting debut with Raj Kumar Gupta's biographical thriller No One Killed Jessica (2011), which also starred Vidya Balan and Rani Mukerji. Based on the murder case of Jessica Lal, the film saw Ayyub portray the real-life character of Manu Sharma, Jessica's true murderer. The film, as well as his performance, generated positive reviews from critics. In his second release of the year, Ayyub appeared in Ali Abbas Zafar's directorial debut—the romantic comedy Mere Brother Ki Dulhan, about a man who finds a bride for his elder brother but falls in love with her instead. Co-starring alongside Katrina Kaif, Imran Khan, and Ali Zafar, he played the role of Khan's friend. Mere Brother Ki Dulhan proved his second consecutive box-office hit and earned over  worldwide. In 2011, he also appeared in a cameo role for the successful romantic comedy Tanu Weds Manu, which marked the first of his four films with Aanand L. Rai.

In 2012, Ayyub took another supporting role—this time in Kunal Deshmukh's thriller Jannat 2, co-starring Emraan Hashmi, Esha Gupta, and Randeep Hooda. Initially titled Informer, its title was changed to Jannat 2, making it a sequel to Jannat (2008).

Ayyub next appeared in Aanand L. Rai's romantic drama Raanjhanaa (2013), alongside Dhanush, Sonam Kapoor, and Abhay Deol, in which he played the character of Dhanush's friend. In his next film—Hansal Mehta's National Film Award-winning biographical drama Shahid, starring Rajkummar Rao as slain lawyer and human rights activist Shahid Azmi—Ayyub played Arif Azmi who is Azmi's brother. The film generated overwhelmingly mixed reviews though became commercially successful at the box office.

Career struggles, Tanu Weds Manu 2, and hiatus (2014–15)

In 2014, Ayyub reteamed with Kunal Deshmukh in the action comedy Raja Natwarlal, which starred Emraan Hashmi as the titular protagonist.

In 2015, Ayyub appeared in four films, the first of which was Abhishek Dogra's directorial debut—the comedy Dolly Ki Doli, co-starring Sonam Kapoor, Pulkit Samrat, Rajkummar Rao, and Varun Sharma. The film, about a woman who marries men from different religions and runs with their wealth on the wedding night, received moderate reviews and was average at the box office. Ayyub's next two releases were the action comedy All is Well and the spy thriller Phantom, both of which were also box office failures. His final release of the year was a second collaboration with Aanand L. Rai in Tanu Weds Manu: Returns, a romantic comedy that served as a sequel to Tanu Weds Manu (2011). Ayyub featured as Chintu Kumar Singh, a lawyer and an admirer of the titular protagonist (played by Kangana Ranaut).

Raees, Tubelight, and work in unsuccessful expensive films  (2017–18)

After a two-year absence from full-time acting, Ayyub appeared in Rahul Dholakia's crime drama Raees (2017), in which he starred alongside Shah Rukh Khan, Nawazuddin Siddiqui, and Mahira Khan, and played the friend of the titular anti-hero, played by Khan. Said to be based on the life of criminal Abdul Latif, Raees generated mixed to positive reviews from critics. But with grossings of over  worldwide, it proved to be Ayyub's highest-grossing release and one of the highest-grossing Indian films of all time. He next appeared in Kabir Khan's war drama Tubelight, portraying the role of Salman Khan's friend. In his final release of the year, Ayyub played his first leading and the title role in Dakxin Chhara's directorial debut—the action drama Sameer—another box office disappointment.

Both the films generated mixed reviews and failed at both the Indian and overseas box office, thus making 2018 an unsuccessful year in Ayyub's career.

Manikarnika and other supporting roles (2019–present)

Ayyub's first release of 2019 was the biographical war drama Manikarnika: The Queen of Jhansi, based on the life of freedom fighter Rani Lakshmi Bai, portrayed by Kangana Ranaut in the film. His role was originally portrayed by Sonu Sood, who left the film because of some disagreements with the film's makers as the director Krish got replaced, and was subsequently replaced by Ayyub.

Later that year, Ayyub co-starred with Ayushmann Khurrana in Anubhav Sinha's crime thriller Article 15. Highlighting caste discrimination in India, it was inspired by multiple events, including the 2014 Badaun gang rape allegations and the 2016 Una flogging incident. He next starred alongside Diljit Dosanjh and Kriti Sanon on Rohit Jugraj Chauhan's spoof comedy Arjun Patiala, a major commercial disaster. This changed later that year when Ayyub played Rishi Aggarwal, an army officer whose devoted wife (essayed by Taapsee Pannu) becomes a nurse for him, in Jagan Shakti's directorial debut Mission Mangal—a science fiction film about the scientists who contributed to the Mars Orbiter Mission held in 2013.

In 2020, he played a negative role in Hansal Mehta's directed film Chhalaang.

In 2021, Ayyub is appearing in the web series Tandav, directed by Ali Abbas Zafar streaming on Amazon Prime Video. He is scheduled to appear in Atrangi Re alongside Akshay Kumar, Dhanush and Sara Ali Khan, which is releasing in August.

Filmography

Films

Web series

References

External links
 
 

Living people
21st-century Indian male actors
Indian male film actors
Kirori Mal College alumni
Male actors from Delhi
Male actors in Hindi cinema
National School of Drama alumni
1984 births